The Bahamas national under-16 and under-17 basketball team is a national basketball team of the Bahamas, managed by the Bahamas Basketball Federation.

It represents the country in international under-16 and under-17 (under age 16 and under age 17) basketball competitions.

See also
Bahamas national basketball team
Bahamas national under-19 basketball team
Bahamas women's national under-17 basketball team

References

External links
Bahamas Basketball Records at FIBA Archive

Bahamas national basketball team
Men's national under-17 basketball teams